Taran-Bazar is a village in the Jalal-Abad Region of Kyrgyzstan. It is part of Suzak District. It was known as Dmitrievka until June 2003. Its population was 3,522 in 2021.

References
 

Populated places in Jalal-Abad Region